is vertically scrolling run and gun video game and designed by Yoshiki Okamoto and released in arcades in 1985. Gun.Smoke centers on a character named Billy Bob, a bounty hunter going after the criminals of the Wild West.

Gameplay
Gun Smoke is a run and gun video game in which the screen automatically scrolls upward. Players use three buttons to shoot left, right, and center. The player can also change the way Billy shoots through button combinations. The player dies by getting shot, struck by enemies, or caught between an obstacle and the bottom of the screen. The player can collect various items, including a horse for extra protection, boots for increased movement speed, bullets for faster shots, a yashichi for an extra life, and a rifle for longer shot range. Other items add points to your score such as stars, bottles, bags, and dragonflies.

Two versions of Gun.Smoke were released in North America by Romstar.

Ports
Gun.Smoke was ported to these systems:

The MSX
The PlayStation and Sega Saturn as a part of Capcom Generation 4
The PlayStation 2, PlayStation Portable and Xbox as a part of Capcom Classics Collection
The PlayStation 3 and Xbox 360 as a part of Capcom Arcade Cabinet
Windows 98 and Windows XP as a part of Capcom Arcade Hits Volume 3 
The Amstrad CPC as Desperado – Gun.Smoke; this platform received a sequel called Desperado 2
The ZX Spectrum

NES version

The game was later ported to the Nintendo Entertainment System (NES) and Family Computer Disk System (FDS) in 1988. The game has a new storyline: In 1849, a gang known as the Wingates attacks the town of Hicksville, kills the sheriff, and causes trouble everyday until Billy, the main character, comes to town to free it from the gang. The NES version also has different music.

Soundtrack

The soundtrack for the arcade version was composed by Ayako Mori. On August 25, 1986, Alfa Records released a limited-edition soundtrack, featuring all of the music from the arcade version, as well as two unused tracks. Its catalog number was Capcom Game Music – 28XA-94.

Reception 
Game Machine listed Gun.Smoke in their January 1986 issue as being the second most-successful table arcade unit of the month in Japan. The US Play Meter charts listed it as one of the top five arcade games the same month. It went on to be Japan's sixth highest-grossing table arcade game during the first half of 1986.

The arcade game received positive reviews. In a January 1986 issue of Play Meter magazine, Frank Seninsky listed Gun.Smoke as the top recommended arcade conversion kit, calling it "a number-one kit with great graphics." Computer and Video Games magazine gave the arcade game a positive review in March 1986, calling it an "excellent" fast-paced shooter, considering it to be better than light gun shooters such as Hogan's Alley and Shoot Out.

Sequel 
A sequel, titled Desperado 2, was developed by Topo Soft and released in 1991. The game was released on Amstrad CPC, MS-DOS, MSX, and ZX Spectrum.

See also
 Commando

References

External links

Gun.Smoke at the arcade history database
Gun.Smoke: NES Game Coverage

1985 video games
Amstrad CPC games
Arcade video games
Capcom games
Famicom Disk System games
NTDEC games
Video games set in the United States
MSX games
Nintendo Entertainment System games
Vertically scrolling shooters
Western (genre) video games
ZX Spectrum games
PlayStation 3 games
PlayStation Network games
Romstar games
Video games developed in Japan
Xbox 360 Live Arcade games
Video games set in the 19th century
Multiplayer and single-player video games